The Toyota UR engine family is a 32-valve dual overhead camshaft V8 piston engine series which was first introduced in 2006, as the UZ series it replaced began phasing out. Production started with the 1UR-FSE engine with D4-S direct injection for the 2007 Lexus LS. The series launched with a die-cast aluminum engine block, aluminum heads, and magnesium cylinder head covers. All UR engines feature variable valve timing for both intake and exhaust cams or Dual VVT-i. Timing chains are used to drive the camshafts. The UR engine has been produced in 4.6, 5.0, and 5.7-liter displacement versions.

1UR

1UR-FSE

1UR-FSE undergoes X-ray inspection and a CT (computed tomography) scan to ensure minimal deformation after the die-casting process.  Camshafts are hollow to minimize weight.

Applications:
 2006-2017 Lexus LS 460 & LS 460 L
 2008-2011 Lexus GS 460
 2009-2013 Toyota Crown Majesta

1UR-FE
The 1UR-FE is based on the 1UR-FSE but lacks the D4-S direct injection technology. Originally used for Lexus vehicles in the Middle East, it was introduced in 2010 in other markets to replace the 2UZ-FE engine in truck and SUV applications.

Applications:
 2006–2017 Lexus LS 460 & LS 460 L (Middle East)
 2005–2011 Lexus GS 460 (Middle East)
 2009–present Lexus GX 460
 2012–2021 Toyota Land Cruiser (Japan, China, Middle East and Australia)
 2009–2012 Toyota Sequoia
 2009–2019 Toyota Tundra

2UR

2UR-GSE

The 2UR-GSE is a  naturally aspirated V8 engine fitted to the IS F, RC F, GS F, LC 500, and IS 500. It is an all-alloy DOHC, 4 valves per cylinder with Yamaha-designed high-flow cylinder heads, titanium inlet valves, high-lift camshafts and dual-length intake. It has D4-S gasoline port and direct injection, Dual VVT-i with electric VVT-iE inlet camshaft actuation. The engine has a redline of 7,300 rpm. The South Africa-based Gazoo Racing SA Toyota Hilux Dakar truck also utilizes the engine.

In the IS F, the engine had an 11.8:1 compression ratio and produced  @ 6,600 rpm and  @ 5,200 rpm of torque.

Applications:
 2007–2014 Lexus IS F (USE20)
 2015–present Lexus RC F (USC10)
 2015–2020 Lexus GS F (URL10)
 2017–present Lexus LC 500 (URZ100)
 2022–present Lexus IS 500 F-Sport Performance (USE30)
 2016-2021 Toyota Hilux, Toyota GR DKR Hilux

2UR-FSE

The 2UR-FSE is a  engine which previously powered the Lexus LS 600h and the third-generation Toyota Century. It has D4-S gasoline direct injection, Dual VVT-i, and VVT-iE on the intake cam. The electric motors (Lexus Hybrid Drive) in the system add extra power into the drivetrain, allowing the combination to deliver  in total.

The engine's valve covers are made from a magnesium alloy, the cylinder heads are manufactured from aluminum alloy, while like the 1UR engine block it is die-cast to save weight.

Applications:
 2007–2017 Lexus LS 600h & LS 600h L (UVF45/UVF46)
 2018–present Toyota Century (UWG60)

3UR

3UR-FE
The 3UR-FE is a  engine designed for use in the Toyota Tundra, Sequoia, Land Cruiser, and Lexus LX570 vehicles, without the D-4S gasoline direct injection but with Dual VVT-i. A stainless steel exhaust manifold incorporating a 3-way catalytic converter is used. This engine is cast at Toyota's Bodine Aluminum and currently assembled at Toyota Motor Manufacturing Alabama. Over 1.3 million kilometers of durability testing have gone into the engine. E85 ethanol capability was optional for the 2009 model year.

The supercharger kit could be installed by dealers and was covered under warranty. Later on, Magnuson offered an improved version of the supercharger kit which raised the output to 550hp.

Applications:
 2007–2021 Toyota Tundra
 2007–2022 Toyota Sequoia
 2007–2021 Toyota Land Cruiser 200 Series – US and  Middle East markets only
 2007–2021 Lexus LX 570

3UR-FBE
An E85 Ethanol version of the 3UR-FE engine.

Applications:
 2009 – 2014 Toyota Tundra
 2009 – 2014 Toyota Sequoia

References

External links

http://www.toyota.co.jp/en/tech/environment/powertrain/engine/engine2.html

See also

 List of Toyota engines
 List of Toyota transmissions

UR
V8 engines
Gasoline engines by model